This is a list of tennis players who have represented the Spain Fed Cup team in an official Fed Cup match. Spain have taken part in the competition since 1972.

Players

References

External links
RFET, Real Federación Española de Tenis, Inicio

 
Lists of Billie Jean King Cup tennis players